The 2012 E3 Harelbeke was the 55th running of the E3 Harelbeke single-day cycling race. E3 Harelbeke was held as a UCI World Tour event for the first time, after previously being held as a 1.HC race on the UCI Europe Tour. As well as its promotion to the World Tour, the race moved to a Friday running from a Saturday; the move was in order to give riders a day's break prior to the following World Tour event, Gent–Wevelgem.

In a mass sprint finish, the race was won by  rider Tom Boonen, who in the process, became the most successful rider in the history of the race; his fifth victory – after four previous victories in succession between 2004 and 2007 – in Harelbeke took him beyond the record tally of four victories that he had been sharing with fellow Belgian rider Rik Van Looy. Boonen finished ahead of 's Óscar Freire and 's Bernhard Eisel, who completed the podium.

Teams 
As E3 Harelbeke was a UCI World Tour event, all 18 UCI ProTeams were invited automatically and obligated to send a squad. Seven other squads were given wildcard places into the race, and as such, formed the event's 25-team peloton.

The 25 teams that competed in the race were:

Results

References

External links

E3 Harelbeke
E3 Harelbeke
E3 Harelbeke